No Rest for the Wicked is the fifth studio album by English heavy metal vocalist Ozzy Osbourne. It was released on 28 September 1988, and was re-issued / remastered on 22 August 1995, and again on 25 June 2002. The album was certified gold in December 1988 and has since gone double platinum. It peaked at number 13 on the Billboard 200. It was the first album to feature guitarist Zakk Wylde, keyboardist John Sinclair and the first to feature bassist Bob Daisley since Bark at the Moon.

Overview
No Rest for the Wicked is the recording debut of lead guitarist Zakk Wylde. After firing lead guitarist Jake E. Lee in 1987, Osbourne received a demo tape from Wylde and later hired him after an audition.

Bassist/lyricist Bob Daisley made his return to Osbourne's band after the two had a falling out in 1985. Once the album's recording was complete, Daisley was once again out, replaced by Osbourne's former Black Sabbath bandmate Geezer Butler for subsequent promotional tours.

"Miracle Man", "Crazy Babies", and "Breakin' All the Rules" were released as singles with accompanying music videos. The song "Hero" was an unlisted hidden bonus track on the original 1988 CD and cassette releases. The song "Miracle Man" was a pointed barb aimed at disgraced televangelist Jimmy Swaggart. Swaggart had long been critical of Osbourne's music and live performances, before he himself was involved in a 1988 prostitution scandal. The song "Bloodbath in Paradise" references Charles Manson and the Manson Family murders.

Creative Director John Carver was hired by Osbourne's management to conceptualize and direct the album sleeve for "No Rest For the Wicked". Carver's concept was to portray Osbourne as Jesus Christ, with photographer Bob Carlos Clarke taking the cover photo.

Track listing

Personnel
 Ozzy Osbourne – vocals
 Zakk Wylde – guitar
 Bob Daisley – bass
 Randy Castillo – drums
 John Sinclair – keyboards

Production 

Produced by Roy Thomas Baker and Keith Olsen, except "Miracle Man" and "Devil's Daughter", which were produced by Keith Olsen
 Recorded and engineered by Roy Thomas Baker, Gordon Fordyce and Gerry Napier
 Mixed by Keith Olsen
 Michael Sadler of Canadian band Saga did the background vocals shortly before recording was finished, which is why he has no official credits
 Mastered by Greg Fulginiti at Artisan Sound Recorders
 2002 reissue produced by Bruce Dickinson
 2002 remastering by Chris Athens

Charts

Album

Singles

Certifications

References

External links
 
 Official Ozzy Osbourne website

1988 albums
Ozzy Osbourne albums
Albums produced by Keith Olsen
Albums produced by Roy Thomas Baker
Epic Records albums
Columbia Records albums